is a party video game developed by Hudson Soft and published by Nintendo for the GameCube in November 2005. The seventh main installment in the Mario Party series, it makes use of the microphone peripheral introduced in Mario Party 6, and features twelve characters, including two new unlockable characters: Birdo and Dry Bones. Koopa Kid was omitted as a playable character, after being playable in the two previous games.

Mario Party 7 was the fourth and last game in the series released for the GameCube, and was followed by Mario Party 8 for the Wii in May 2007.

Gameplay

The goal of Mario Party 7 is to gather stars, but each board requires it in a different way. For the first time ever since the series' initial release in 1998, eight players may participate in either Party Cruise or Deluxe Cruise (the 8 player equivalent of the Mini-Game Cruise). Players are split into teams of two and are required to share a controller, with the first player using the L button and the Control Stick in mini-games, while the second player uses the R button and the C-stick.

While a mode for a solo player itself isn't new to the Mario Party series, this game's take is very different from any of the previous six games. One player competes against another (either computer controlled or human played), trying to complete the set objective on the board map before the other can. Tasks range from collecting a set number of stars to having a set number of coins on a space. Up to ten slots of different characters with different phrases may be saved. Once a player has completed all six boards, they are added to the rankings section, where it shows the players who took the least turns to complete them.

There are 88 minigames in Mario Party 7, the most in the series up to this point. Like all except Mario Party 2, no minigames from previous editions appear. There are nine types of minigames in the game: 4-player, 1-vs.-3, 2-vs.-2, Battle, Duel, 8-player, DK, Bowser, and Rare. For 4-player and 1-vs.-3, there are an additional five minigames that can be played with the microphone. In 8 player minigames, one player uses the Control Stick and L, and the other player uses the C stick and R. The minigame controls range from pressing a button repeatedly to using the control stick and several buttons. There are extra minigames which the player must purchase in-game to unlock.

Another new addition to this game is "Bowser Time!". This is an event that only occurs every five turns during a Party Cruise match. After each minigame, the meter on the screen will increase by 20% and when the meter is full, Bowser will appear and hinders the players depending on which board that the characters are currently playing. Based on the board, Bowser may destroy bridges, take stars from players, or change star locations. On almost every board at some time, Bowser may take a photo as a "memento" of the vacation and take the players' coins. At other times, he may open a shop that sells the players useless and expensive items, which are then taken by Koopa Kid. "Bowser Time!" may only occur once, or up to nine times, depending on the number of turns played.

This was also the first game in the Mario Party series to have removed the autoplay capability in Party mode (where all players can be manually set to AI, thus enabling the game to "play itself" without any human player). The game will not allow there to be less than one active human player at any time, unless a code is used.

Madhouse Cruise
Toadsworth has invited Mario and all of his friends to go on a luxury cruise around the world due to all the hard work, but Bowser was uninvited. However, Bowser was enraged, furious and angry about this, so he vows revenge. When the cruise ship arrives at its first destination, the passengers discover that Bowser has turned their vacation paradise into a madhouse filled with stress and horror. Mario tries to gain as many stars as possible to end this atrocity before Bowser ruins everything, but is too terrified of the stress to go a step. Soon...well....the ship sinks...but everyone is alive.

Reception

The game received "mixed" reviews according to the review aggregation website Metacritic.  In Japan, Famitsu gave it a score of two eights and two sevens for a total of 30 out of 40. IGN gave the game a 7 out of 10, stating solely it was "a slumber party".

The game sold 1.86 million copies worldwide.

References

External links
Official Japanese website 

2005 video games
Mario Party
Party video games
GameCube games
GameCube-only games
GameCube microphone games
Microphone-controlled computer games
Video games developed in Japan
Multiplayer and single-player video games

de:Mario Party#Mario Party 7